Madarellus undulatus is a species of weevils belonging to the Baridinae subfamily. The prothorax is glossy and somewhat punctate with striate elytron. M. undulatus can be found in both Canada (Ontario and Quebec) and in the United States. Larvae feed on poison ivy and Parthenocissus quinquefolia.

References

External links
Image of Madarellus undulates on BugGuide

Beetles described in 1824
Beetles of North America
Baridinae